Lujan v. G & G Fire Sprinklers, Inc., 532 U.S. 189 (2001), was a United States Supreme Court case decided in 2001. The case concerned a provision of the California Labor Code which allowed the state to withhold payment to contractors or subcontractors if found in breach of contract, without a specific hearing on the matter. The Court upheld the provision because the companies were still able to pursue a claim in state court.

Opinion of the Court
Chief Justice Rehnquist delivered the unanimous Opinion of the Court, reversing the Ninth Circuit Court of Appeals which had ruled the contested labor code regulation unconstitutional. Rehnquist stated that the companies involved would still be able to have the contract dispute reviewed in state court, despite the fact that the immediate withholding of funds was without a hearing. In sum he reasoned, "[I]f California makes ordinary judicial process available to G & G for resolving its contractual dispute, that process is due process."

See also
 INS v. Chadha
 Due Process
 Labour relations

References

External links

United States Supreme Court cases
2001 in United States case law
United States civil due process case law
Government procurement in the United States
Legal history of California
United States Supreme Court cases of the Rehnquist Court